Duane David Allen (born April 29, 1943) is an American singer and songwriter who had formal training in both operatic and quartet singing before becoming a member of The Oak Ridge Boys in 1966. Allen is the lead singer for the quartet and is heard on the majority of their most successful songs.

Biography
Duane is considered the President and CEO of the group.  His personal hobby is the Oak Ridge Boys. He is active on social media and feels obligated to respond quickly to his fans.  He also plans out how many tour days they need each year for his employees to live comfortably.  They still tour roughly 150 days per year.

He was inducted in the Texas Gospel Music Hall of Fame. He attended East Texas State University graduating in 1966, where he was a member of Delta Tau Delta International Fraternity.

On August 9, 2014, Allen was inducted into the Texas Country Music Hall of Fame. The rest of The Oak Ridge Boys—Joe Bonsall, William Lee Golden, and Richard Sterban—were also inducted as honorary members.

Honors
Back in 2014, Duane received a memorial bridge honor in his hometown in Texas.  "I did not know until our bus turned down the small road that the bridge was on ‘our’ road," the singer said. "It was a complete surprise. I thought it would be south of our place, but when we turned down ‘our’ road, now named the Duane Allen Road, my stomach just about came out of my body. I was so thrilled that I did not have the proper words to express myself. I was still emotionally charged when I tried to speak.”
In October 2018 the Paris Junior College in Lamar County named a stage after him in his honor.

Personal life
He is married to Norah Lee Allen, a backup singer on the Grand Ole Opry.  Daughter Jamie is married to musician Paul Martin, formerly of Exile, more recently of Marty Stuart and the Fabulous Superlatives, and they have several children. They formed a family band called Rockland Road.  Son Dee is also a musician. He is part of a group called Tall Dark Stranger.  Duane and Norah live in Hendersonville, Tennessee.

References

2.  https://web.archive.org/web/20160403210531/http://www.cmacloseup.com/2014/04/oak-ridge-boys-duane-allen-receives-memorial-bridge-honor/

3.  http://theboot.com/oak-ridge-boys-duane-allen-retirement/

1943 births
Living people
People from Lamar County, Texas
Country musicians from Texas
American country singer-songwriters
The Oak Ridge Boys members
Texas A&M University–Commerce alumni
Singer-songwriters from Texas